Sir Cormac MacBaron O'Neill (d.1613) was an Irish soldier and landowner of the Elizabethan and early Stuart eras. He was part of the O'Neill dynasty, one of the most prominent Gaelic family in Ireland.

Biography
O'Neill was the son of Matthew O'Neill, 1st Baron Dungannon, who was assassinated by his half-brother and rival Shane O'Neill in 1558. His 'middle name' was a Patronymic, denoting his father's title. O'Neill's older brother was Hugh O'Neill, Earl of Tyrone. 

Despite their father's defeat to Shane, Cormac and Hugh were able to re-establish themselves in Ulster thanks to help from the English government. When Hugh, having been recognised as Earl of Tyrone by the Crown, then launched a rebellion in 1594, Cormac joined forces with him. He took part in the Siege of Enniskillen and the Battle of the Ford of the Biscuits the same year. Following their defeat at the Battle of Kinsale, Cormac remained loyal to his brother when most of his other Gaelic Irish changed sides and made peace with the Crown. Following the Burning of Dungannon, in which Tyrone destroyed his own capital, they fought a guerrilla war, and Cormac was able to ambush a force led by Henry Docwra. Nonetheless his relationship with his brother became increasingly strained, despite the Treaty of Mellifont (1603) in which the Crown pardoned them and restored their lands.

When Hugh O'Neill fled Ireland in 1607, Cormac remained behind, riding to Dublin to inform the authorities of his brother's departure, and claiming he had no part in. His claims however were contradicted by the fact he had learned of his brothers intentions at Dunalonge, being only five miles from the garrisons of Derry or Lifford, both near Lough Swilly where the earl departed. Rather than informing either garrison who would have been better placed to prevent the earl from departing he choose to give the earl as much time as possible by riding to Dublin instead. As such he was arrested and remained in prison for the remainder of his life, although he was never charged with any crime and government officials privately admitted he offered no threat, but should be kept locked up.

One son, Bryan Crossagh O'Neill, was granted a small proportion of land, consisting of 1,000 acres, in Dungannon barony as part of the Plantation of Ulster. However, he was executed in 1615 for his part of the 1614 conspiracy. Another son Conn MacCormac O'Neill (or Constantino O'Neill) was an officer in the Spanish Army. Conn was considered the heir to the Earl of Tyrone by some, but this was not formally recognized because of the Crown's earlier attainder.

References

Bibliography
 McGurk, John. Sir Henry Docwra, 1564-1631: Derry's Second Founder. Four Courts Press, 2006.
 Morgan, Hiram. Tyrone's Rebellion. Boydell Press, 1999.
Farrell, Gerard, The 'Mere Irish' and the Colonisation of Ulster, 1570-1641. Palgrave Macmillan, 2017.

16th-century Irish people
17th-century Irish people
People from County Tyrone
Irish knights
O'Neill dynasty
Younger sons of barons